Chester Terrace is a historic rowhouse in Duluth, Minnesota, United States.  Built in 1890, it was designed in Romanesque Revival style by Oliver G. Traphagen and Francis W. Fitzpatrick.  It was listed on the National Register of Historic Places in 1980 for its local significance in the theme of architecture.  It was nominated as one of Duluth's outstanding examples of a Romanesque Revival rowhouse.

Chester Terrace was built using brick and brownstone.  The design features towers, turrets, gables, and finials.  The building is named after Chester Creek, which flows into Lake Superior near the building.

See also
 National Register of Historic Places listings in St. Louis County, Minnesota

References

1890 establishments in Minnesota
Buildings and structures in Duluth, Minnesota
Houses completed in 1890
Houses in St. Louis County, Minnesota
Houses on the National Register of Historic Places in Minnesota
National Register of Historic Places in St. Louis County, Minnesota
Romanesque Revival architecture in Minnesota